Guy Hartcup (13 May 1919 – 18 March 2012) was an author and military historian. His published works focused on the history of 20th-century military technology.

Publications

References

External links
Library of Congress Catalog

British military historians
1919 births
2012 deaths